Walnut Hills High School is a public college-preparatory high school in  Cincinnati, Ohio. Operated by Cincinnati Public Schools, it houses grades seven through twelve. The school was established in 1895 and has occupied its current building since 1932.

History
The school was the third district public high school established in the city of Cincinnati, following Hughes H.S. and Withrow H.S., and was opened in September 1895 on the corner of Ashland and Burdett Avenues in Cincinnati. As a district high school, it accommodated the conventional four years (grades 9–12).

In 1919, Walnut Hills became a classical high school (college-preparatory school) and was expanded to accommodate six years (grades 7–12). Students were drawn from the entire city, rather than from a defined district within the city.

A new building on Victory Boulevard (now Victory Parkway) was built on  acquired from the Catholic Archdiocese of Cincinnati and completed in 1931. Designed by architect Frederick W. Garber's firm, it remains in use today. The facility was designed for 1700 students and included 31 class rooms, 3 study halls, choral harmony and band rooms, a general shop, a print shop, a mechanical drawing room, 2 swimming pools (separate swimming for boys and girls), a library, a large and a small auditorium, and a kitchen for teaching cooking (with pantry and adjacent living room and dining room).

Examples of Cincinnati's famous Rookwood Pottery are to be found throughout the building, including the masks of comedy and tragedy adorning the proscenium arch of the large theatrical auditorium.  The school's original Ashland and Burdett location became the Burdett School in 1932, which closed in 1979.

Four temporary, prefabricated steel classrooms, called "The Colony" or "the Tin Can" by resentful students, were installed in 1958 to accommodate the increasing student population. As of the 2011–2012 school year, these have been demolished.  In 1960, a one-story annex added 17 classrooms, including a language laboratory and typing lab, to the school. In 1976, a Fine Arts Complex was added, partially supplementing existing facilities near the main auditorium.  In 1998, the Annex was razed and an Arts and Science Center containing 30 classrooms and science labs replaced it in 1999.

The school opened a new stadium in September 2006 named after alumnus Robert S. Marx, who went on to become a judge in Michigan.  In 2016, a new two-toned synthetic turf was installed.

A comprehensive renovation project began in the 2010–2011 school year, and was completed for the 2014–2015 school year. The $56 million project funded by both Cincinnati Public Schools  and the school's Alumni Foundation included a complete renovation of the original 1931 building, new music lyceum and athletic complex, including a new gym seating 1200 along 3 of the 4 walls, locker rooms, and a full size natatorium featuring a 25-meter, 6 lane pool. The new gym held its first game on November 30, 2012.

A two-floor, 15 classroom foreign language wing was built, along with 4 outdoor courtyards around the school. The building remained open and in use, with 7 temporary modular buildings removed in 2013 to make way for the Christopher South Athletic Complex, which opened in October 2014. The complex features an all-weather synthetic turf field lined for football, soccer, and lacrosse, stands that seat 400, a press box, concessions, and batting cages. Six new hard-surface tennis courts opened in the spring of 2016.

Academics
All students must pass a standardized test in math and reading to be accepted to the school.

Clubs and activities
Walnut Hills' Latin Club functions as a local chapter of both the Ohio Junior Classical League (OJCL) and National Junior Classical League (NJCL).

Athletics
The sports teams have played in various regional leagues since the demise of the Public High School League in 1984. The 2012–2013 boys' basketball team finished the regular season 21–1, ranked #1 in Ohio and #18 in the country.  They advanced to the Final Four in the tournament. The game was played at OSU's Schottenstein Center. They lost to Toledo Rogers.

Ohio High School Athletic Association Team State Championships
Boys' Swimming – 1950, 1955

Notable alumni

Darren Anderson (1987) professional football player (NFL 1992–1998)
Stan Aronoff (1950), politician and longtime member of the Ohio Senate
Helen Elsie Austin (1924), attorney, US Foreign Service Officer, first black female graduate of UC Law School, first black woman to serve as Assistant Attorney General of Ohio
Theda Bara (Theodosia Goodman 1903), early movie star of the silent screen
Janet Biehl (1971), author and graphic novelist
Caroline Black (botanist) (1887–1930)
Ric Bucher (1979), NBA correspondent, author and radio presenter
Elisabeth Bumiller (1974), New York Times White House correspondent
Stanley M. Chesley (1954), attorney who won Bhopal, MGM Grand, and Beverly Hills Supper Club fire class action settlements
Michael L. Chyet (1975), linguist
Carl W. Condit (1932), historian of urban and architectural history
Douglas S. Cramer (1949), TV and Broadway producer, art collector, co-founder and board member of Museum of Contemporary Art, Los Angeles, board member Museum of Modern Art, New York.
Naomi Deutsch (1908), public health nursing administrator, author
Jim Dine (1953), pop artist
Michael Dine (1971), theoretical physicist
Alan Dressler (1966), astronomer and astrophysicist
Elizabeth Brenner Drew (1953), political journalist, author and lecturer
Isadore Epstein (1937), astronomer
Frank Benjamin Foster, III (1946) saxophonist, composer, member of Count Basie Orchestra
Paula Froelich, Columnist Page Six of The New York Post
Helen Iglauer Glueck (1925), physician and hematology researcher
Dick Gordon, professional football player 1965–1974 for Chicago, Green Bay, Los Angeles, San Diego
Marcel Groen  (1963), attorney and Chairman of the Pennsylvania Democratic Party
Charles Guggenheim (1942), four-time Academy Award winner for documentaries
Richard S. Hamilton, geometer who discovered the Ricci flow (and applied it to the Poincaré conjecture), winner of the Veblen and Shaw Prizes
Fred Hersch, jazz composer and musician, Grammy Award nominee
Charles R. Hook, Sr. (1898), American industrialist, former president of Armco Steel Corp
Ronald Howes, toy inventor; invented the Easy-Bake Oven
DeHart Hubbard (1921), first African-American to win an individual gold medal in the Olympics (long jump – 1924 Paris Summer Games)
Miller Huggins (1897), managed Babe Ruth and the New York Yankees, inducted into the Baseball Hall of Fame in 1964
Rick Hughes (1991), professional basketball player in European leagues
Fred Karpoff (1981) pianist
Kenneth Koch (1947), poet of the New York School, dramatist and educator
Walter Laufer, Olympic gold medalist
James Levine (1961), pianist, conductor, Musical Director of the Metropolitan Opera and the Boston Symphony Orchestra
Steven Levinson (1964), Associate Justice of the Supreme Court of Hawaii from 1992 to 2008
Sabina Magliocco (1977), professor of Anthropology and Religion at the University of British Columbia
Jonathan Meyer (1982), lawyer and general counsel of the United States Department of Homeland Security
Alexis Nikole Nelson, forager and internet personality
Stanley B. Prusiner (1960), 1997 Nobel Prize for medicine
Carl West Rich (1916), attorney, Hamilton County prosecutor, city councilman and three-term mayor of Cincinnati, US Congressman
Lois Rosenthal, author, publisher, arts & humanities philanthropist.
Jerry Rubin (1956), 1960s-era radical and later a social activist
Stephen Sanger (1964), Chairman and CEO of General Mills
Robert Shmalo (1996), international ice dancing competitor
Itaal Shur (1985), Grammy Award winner (2000) 
Lee Smolin (1972), theoretical physicist
Donald Andrew Spencer Sr. (1932), first African American trustee of Ohio University
Rick Steiner (1964), stockbroker, professional poker player, five-time Tony Award-winning Broadway producer
MaCio Teague (2015), basketball player, member of the NCAA Champion 2020–21 Baylor Bears basketball team
Tony Trabert (1948), tennis star of the 1950s, won 1955 French Open, Wimbledon, and US Open
Jean Trounstine (1965), author, actress, activist on prison issues
Jonathan Valin (1965), mystery series novelist
Evelyn Venable (1930), Hollywood actress with star on Hollywood Walk of Fame; professor of ancient Greek and Latin at UCLA
Richard Weber, emeritus professor on the Faculty of Mathematics, University of Cambridge
Worth Hamilton Weller (1931), herpetologist
Mary Wineberg (1998), track and field Olympian, gold medalist in the women's 4 × 400 m relay at the 2008 Beijing Olympics

References

External links

School Website

School buildings completed in 1931
Cincinnati Public Schools
Educational institutions established in 1895
High schools in Hamilton County, Ohio
1895 establishments in Ohio
Public high schools in Ohio
Public middle schools in Ohio
Walnut Hills, Cincinnati